Raphaël Desroses (born 18 October 1980 in Melun, France) is a French former professional basketball player.

Professional career
During his pro career, Desroses played with the French 1st Division and French 2nd Division clubs Cholet, Roanne, Besançon, and Limoges, from 2003 to 2011. He was the French 2nd Division French Player's MVP in 2006.

References

French men's basketball players
1980 births
Living people
Sportspeople from Melun
Limoges CSP players
Montpellier Paillade Basket players
Junior college men's basketball players in the United States
Cholet Basket players
20th-century French people
21st-century French people